The First Dikshit cabinet was the Council of Ministers in second Delhi Legislative Assembly headed by Chief Minister Sheila Dikshit.

Council members
 Ashok Kumar Walia
 Parvez Hashmi - Minister of Transport, Public Works Department, Land and Building and Delhi Metro
 Krishna Tirath - Minister of Social Welfare, SC & ST and Labour & Employment
 Narendra Nath - Minister of Education, Technical Education, Power, Tourism, and Languages
 Mahinder Singh Saathi
 Yoganand Shastri

References

Cabinets established in 1998
1998 establishments in Delhi
Delhi cabinets
Indian National Congress state ministries
2003 disestablishments in India
Cabinets disestablished in 2003